Mrs. Munger's Class is two seasons of brief, 90-second skits on Disney's One Saturday Morning on ABC that featured the talking heads of a middle school yearbook page.  The kids in the photos would often exchange silly dialogue and insults, while Mrs. Munger would tell them to "Simmer down! Simmer! Simmer!"  The camera would focus on whoever was speaking on one part of the yearbook page and quickly pan to follow the dialogue.  Students would move between the pictures to interact with one another.  The show was in black and white, but color was used on occasion (on field trips or to show cosmetics).

Technical details
Directed by animator Tim Maloney, and produced by Disney for the One Saturday Morning children's programming block on ABC, the skits used Corel computer software to manipulate photographs from a school yearbook.  With the aid of computer animation that superimposed facial expressions, the photographs would appear to move their lips as the characters spoke dialogue, creating an effect similar to the Syncro-Vox cartoons of the 1960s.  The skits ran for 18 months during the 1997-98 season, and during the later half of 1998, until a class action lawsuit was brought against Disney over the use of actual school portraits used to create the characters.

Controversy
Although the school portraits used in the show were manipulated, collaged, and otherwise altered, the plaintiffs in the class action lawsuit felt that there was still too much resemblance.  As such, the plaintiffs claimed the photographs were used for entertainment without personality rights clearance.  Mrs. Munger turned out to be Mrs. Kathleen Foresman, who had taught at Woodbridge Middle School in the Washington, D.C. suburb of Woodbridge, Virginia, in 1975 when her picture and those of her 6th grade students were taken for a page in a yearbook.  She, and four of her former students, filed suit against Disney on December 23, 1998.  Edward Jackson, a computer engineer in San Diego, had learned that his likeness was being used after his 10-year-old niece brought the similarity to his attention.  Jackson, an African-American, was outraged not only at the use of his photo, but at the "Buckwheat"-like speech pattern of the character.  The lawsuit was settled for undisclosed damages.

Adult characters
Mrs. Munger (voiced by Peter Hastings): The teacher. She regularly urges the class to "simmer" when things get out of hand. When things get too much out of hand, she yells out, “HEY!” Although often expressing frustration toward the class, she generally manages to take things in stride. Usually, each episode would end with her saying, "Good gravy!" or “Oh for the love of (insert object)!”
Susan Weiner: The field hockey coach. Appears as a substitute teacher in "Substitute Teacher" and attempts to teach fire safety in "Fire Drill".
Fern Berkowitz: A woman who teaches creative movement to the students in the episode "Creative Movement". Mrs. Munger and Fern were roommates at Chunkin College.
Mrs. Yamaguchi: An Asian-American teacher from the next room, whom Rock mischievously telecommunicates with the class in the episode "Class Computer".
Sven: A somewhat effeminate man with a European accent. He gives Mrs. Munger a makeover in "Make-Over".

Students
In order from top left to bottom right:

Lance (voiced by Rob Paulsen): Speaks only in Pig Latin. Apart from Cissy tattling, no one acknowledges this.
Gordon (voiced by Cree Summer): Gordon generally utters sassy comebacks and one-liners. He finishes his quotes with "ole!"
Karyn (voiced by C.J. Arabia): She is obsessed with death.
Artie (voiced by Brett Bauer): A New Jersey kid. Most of his statements are very simple, or even unrelated to the topic at hand. When asked to interpret an art piece, for example, he responds with "I'm hungry and my feet hurt".
Dawn (voiced by Melissa Samuels): The class kiss-up, who reveals that she is overcompensating for her parents that travel a lot.  She often refers to her fellow students as "the children". Her portrait is located directly next to Mrs. Munger's. She is also implied to be Jewish during the Christmas episode.
Cissy (voiced by C.J. Arabia): The tattletale. In field trip episodes, she often wears her girl scout uniform, numbered "666".
Yvonne (voiced by Cree Summer): A black liberal feminist, in tune with modern art and high culture. Her responses usually pertain to oppression, social injustice and other common feminist complaints.
Grace (voiced by Melissa Samuels): She is the figurative punching bag of the class. She generally says "Cut it out!"
Theodore (voiced by Peter Hastings): A generally clueless student who stalls, stutters and takes forever to answer a question, even then almost always giving the wrong answer.
Rock (voiced by Rob Paulsen): The class nerd. He doesn't talk until late season 1, but only in object–subject–verb-style (Yoda speak). Rock is friends with Lance and in the "Creative Movement" episode implies that he believes himself to be from another planet.
Amanda (voiced by C.J. Arabia): A flower child. She likes to sing or recite poetry. Most of her lines are sung.
Phoebe (voiced by Melissa Samuels): Prone to random outbursts, stares the rest of the time.  She brings her mom's cosmetics to school in several Season 2 episodes.
George and George (voiced by Brett Bauer): The trouble-makers who are both named George and look alike. When people call them twins, they always say, "We're not twins!"
Mahoot (voiced by Brett Bauer): Mahoot's only usual line of dialog is a brief, throaty "what" whenever he is addressed. In 'Good Will Mahoot', he said an actual sentence, followed by "What" when a stunned Mrs. Munger asks him to repeat himself. In "Simmer Minute", the thoughts inside his head are radio interference noises.

Class pets
Gerald the Gerbil is a deceased class pet. 
Rupert is a turtle. On his first day in the class, some of the students annoy him, and he retaliates by biting them.

One-time students
Darryl: Mahoot's cousin, who appeared only in "Mahoot's Cousin". He also says only "What?" and is apparently dumber and weirder than Mahoot. He has a crush on Phoebe.
Farquhar: A foreign exchange student from Sri Lanka. Only seen in "Exchange Student".

Episodes

Season 1
 Word Problem (09/13/1997)
 Origami (09/20/1997)
 Math, Sarcasm, and Paper (09/27/1997)
 The Curve (10/04/1997)
 En Espagnol (10/11/1997)
 Field Trip (10/18/1997)
 Halloween (10/25/1997)
 Permission Slips (11/01/1997)
 The Zoo (11/08/1997)
 Substitute Teacher (11/15/1997)
 Thanksgiving (11/22/1997)
 Rock's Song (11/29/1997)
 Oral Reports (12/06/1997)
 Spelling Bee (12/13/1997)
 Christmas (12/20/1997)
 Seeing Things (01/03/1998)
 The Pits (01/17/1998)
 Calisthenics (01/31/1998)
 President's Day (02/14/1998)
 Seating Chart (02/21/1998)
 Film Strip (02/28/1998)
 Mahoot's Cousin (03/07/1998)

Season 2
 Chemical Reaction (09/05/1998)
 Wild Blue Yonder (09/12/1998)
 Exchange Student (09/19/1998)
 Career Day (09/26/1998)
 Creative Movement (09/26/1998)
 Art Museum (10/03/1998)
 Fire Drill (10/10/1998)
 Aquarium (10/17/1998)
 Bake Sale (10/24/1998)
 Class Computer (10/24/1998)
 Class Pet (10/31/1998)
 Make-Over (11/07/1998)
 Tallest Building (11/14/1998)
 Simmer Minute (11/21/1998)
 Gerald the Gerbil (11/21/1998)
 Onomatopoeia (11/28/1998)
 Good Will Mahoot (12/05/1998)
 Girls' Room (12/12/1998)
 First Snow (12/19/1998)

Centerville
After Mrs. Munger's Class ended its run, a spinoff short series called Centerville aired, based upon the same student-photo premise. Unlike its predecessor, the characters in Centerville were not bound to the page of a yearbook and appeared in various settings. This series, however, was short lived.

Centerville adults
Murph: The lunchlady. She gets annoyed by students not moving, so she generally says: "Move it along!"
Brad (Voiced by Rob Paulsen): A high school student who works at Taco Freeze (which sells neither tacos nor ice cream, only hamburgers). He is also the guitar player for his garage rock band. He will often say, "Alright, alright".  When he's in his garage band, he says, "This band is gonna rock!"
Mitch (Voiced by Rob Paulsen): The bus driver. He's always in a bad mood and generally says "In your seats!"

Centerville students
Boyd (voiced by Tara Strong)- Boyd generally makes sarcastic remarks. He's also the drummer of Brad's garage rock band.
Doight (voiced by Samuel Vincent)- He always brings stuff he thinks are interesting, much to Boyd's annoyance. He generally says "Pretty cool, huh?" after he shows his stuff to everyone.
Fran (voiced by Gloria Figura)- She always talk about feeling sick. She also plays clarinet in Brad's garage rock band.
Lily- A student with a lisp. She also thinks bus rides are boring.
Seth- A student who's annoying and rude and speaks in rhyme. For example, "I'm sitting here, go plant your rear!" He annoys Brad and is rude to Sigourney; Boyd mentions that he was held back, likely because of this behavior.
Sigourney- The valley girl. She's also the singer of Brad's garage rock band. Her trademark catchphrase is "cha", which she inserts in each one of her statements.

Other students include:

One student who answers every question with a clueless "I......" Possibly inspired by Mahoot in Mrs. Munger's Class. 
One student who likes to talk only about video games. His trademark catchphrase is, "There's this part in this game where....."
One girl who's the compulsive liar of the group; she always brags about her dad, making up tall tales about his many accomplishments, never telling the same story twice. (e.g. "My dad is the president of the United States.")
One girl seen riding in some of the bus segments.

Centerville episodes
 Cafeteria 1 (09/04/1999)
 Cafeteria 2 (09/11/1999)
 Taco Freeze 1 (09/18/1999)
 The Bus 1 (09/25/1999)
 Lockers (09/25/1999)
 Cafeteria 3 (10/02/1999)
 The Bus 2 (10/09/1999)
 Taco Freeze 2 (10/16/1999)
 Buth Thtop (10/23/1999)
 The Bus 3 (10/23/1999)
 Taco Freeze 3 (10/30/1999)
 Urp (11/06/1999)
 Sick of Science (11/13/1999)
 Garage Band 1 (11/20/1999)
 Garage Band 2 (11/20/1999)
 Garage Band 3 (11/27/1999)
 Lost Rock (Garage Band 4) (12/04/1999)
 Election Bus (12/11/1999)
 Holiday Grub (12/18/1999)

References

ABC Kids (TV programming block)
1997 American television series debuts
1998 American television series endings
1999 American television series debuts
1999 American television series endings
1990s American children's television series
1990s American school television series
English-language television shows
Middle school television series
Television series about children
Television series about educators
Television series by Disney
Yearbooks